Roman Smolej (born September 6, 1946) is a former Yugoslav ice hockey player. He played for the Yugoslavia men's national ice hockey team at the 1968 Winter Olympics in Grenoble, the 1972 Winter Olympics in Sapporo, and the 1976 Winter Olympics in Innsbruck.

References

1946 births
Living people
Ice hockey players at the 1968 Winter Olympics
Ice hockey players at the 1972 Winter Olympics
Ice hockey players at the 1976 Winter Olympics
Olympic ice hockey players of Yugoslavia
Sportspeople from Jesenice, Jesenice
Slovenian ice hockey centres
Yugoslav ice hockey centres
HDD Olimpija Ljubljana players
HK Acroni Jesenice players